"Angry" is the solo debut single by American indie rock singer Mars Argo after parting ways with Titanic Sinclair. The song was independently released digitally on April 25, 2022 with no prior announcement, and was the first Mars Argo song available on major streaming services, as well as the first new song released by Mars Argo in 10 years.

Release history

References 

2022 singles
2022 debut singles